Derrien may refer to:

People
Notable people with this surname include:
 André Derrien (1895-1994), French sailor
 Marcelle Derrien (1916–2008), French actress
 Maxence Derrien (born 1993) is a French footballer
 Sandrine Derrien, French table tennis player

Places
 La Roche-Derrien, Brittany, France
 Saint-Derrien, Brittany, France